XHQZ-FM is a radio station on 94.9 FM in San Juan de los Lagos, Jalisco. It is known as Ritmo 94.9.

History
XEQZ-AM 1540 received its concession on April 17, 1970. It was owned by José Ismael Alvarado Robles and later moved to 720 kHz, with power staying at 1 kW day.

XEQZ was authorized to move to FM in 2011.

References

Radio stations in Jalisco